A Letter of Understanding (LOU) is a formal text that sums up the terms of an undertakings of a contract which may have been negotiated up to this point only in spoken form or otherwise informally. It reviews the terms of an agreement for a service, a project or a deal and is often written as a step before a more detailed contract is issued.

The LOU may provide for example:
 Detailed summary of the work to be performed
 Tasks of the service provider and the receiver
 Milestones for the work to be done
 Work steps that have been accomplished already

References

Law and economics